Danica d'Hondt (born 29 May 1939) is an English-Canadian actress, writer and businesswoman. She was a winner of the Miss Canada pageant in 1958 and has worked in American television and film, and theater productions in the San Francisco area.

Biography
d'Hondt was born in London, England, of an Irish mother and a Belgian father. She is the sister of Canadian Olympic Gold Medalist Walter D'Hondt, the mother of actress America Olivo, and mother-in-law of actors Christian Campbell and Jason Brooks.

D'Hondt began her career at the age of nine by appearing in a movie at Shepperton Studios in England. She worked in radio, TV and on stage in Canada, where her family emigrated while she was still in school. She graduated from high school in Montreal, and returned to England after attending the University of British Columbia in Vancouver. She worked as a stage actress in London, also performing in radio and TV dramas for the BBC, and then relocated to Toronto, Canada, where she became a CBC-TV game show personality and a talk show host at an early age. She also appeared on TV shows out of New York City, and in summer stock theatre in New York and Illinois. She starred with comic Harvey Korman in Living Venus (1961), a film shot in Chicago in 1960.

D'Hondt's Hollywood career spans the years from 1960 to 1990, during which time she starred in "B" movies, played supporting roles in major Hollywood movies, and performed guest-starring roles on TV shows of the time as The Man from U.N.C.L.E. (1964); The Wild Wild West (1965); Voyage to the Bottom of the Sea (1964); and Tarzan (1966). She turned down the role of "Ginger" in Gilligan's Island (1964).

She left Hollywood from 1966 to 1971, during which time she worked as a theatre director in the San Francisco Bay Area, where she also wrote for a magazine, produced educational films and taught acting at her own school, "The Actor's Lab", on Sacramento Street.

Upon her return to Hollywood in 1971, she directed several stage productions, worked as a writer and associate producer in film and television, and did a stint as a television journalist, becoming the Consumer and Financial Reporter to a syndicated daytime magazine show called "Breakaway".

She relocated to Northern California in the 1990s, became active in real estate investing and had two non-fiction books published.

D'Hondt is married to businessman and winemaker Nello Olivo, and they have six children together. The couple lives on a vineyard in the Sierra Foothills, where she writes, teaches, and helps tend their vineyard. The couple also owns a large restaurant and banquet facility in Placerville, California, named "Sequoia".

Filmography
1971: A Step Out of Line ... Doreen
1966: Unkissed Bride ... Dr. Marilyn Richards
1966: Tarzan ... Maggie Calloway
1965: Voyage to the Bottom of the Sea ... Lola Hale
1965: The Wild Wild West ... Roxanne
1965: A Very Special Favor ... Jacqueline
1965: The Man from U.N.C.L.E. ... Lucia Nazarone
1965: Valentine's Day ... Donna
1964: The Cara Williams Show ... Constance (episode "Cara, Girl Genius")
1964: A House Is Not a Home ... Vicki
1964: Bedtime Story ... Miss Knudsen
1964: Wild and Wonderful ... Monique
1964: Mr. Smith Goes to Washington ... Diana
1962: I'm Dickens, He's Fenster ... Dianne
1961: Living Venus ... Peggy Brandon

References

Notes

Sources & further reading

External links

 
 movies.yahoo.com

1939 births
Living people
Actresses from London
British real estate businesspeople
Canadian beauty pageant winners
Canadian expatriates in the United States
Canadian film actresses
Canadian non-fiction writers
Canadian people of Belgian descent
Canadian people of Irish descent
Canadian real estate businesspeople
Canadian restaurateurs
Women restaurateurs
Canadian theatre directors
Canadian winemakers
English beauty pageant winners
English film actresses
English non-fiction writers
English people of Belgian descent
English people of Irish descent
English restaurateurs
English stage actresses
English theatre directors
English winemakers
English emigrants to Canada
English expatriates in the United States
Miss Canada winners
Miss World 1960 delegates
University of British Columbia alumni
20th-century English women
20th-century English people